A self-reference puzzle is a type of logical puzzle where the question in the puzzle refers to the attributes of the puzzle itself.
A common example is that a "fill in the blanks" style sentence is given, but what is filled in the blanks can contribute to the sentence itself. An example is "There are _ e's in this sentence.", for which a solution is "eight" (since including the "eight", there are 8 e's in the sentence).

References

Examples 
 Jim Propp's original SRAT
 Interactive self-referential quizzes
 Self-Referencing Crossword Puzzle
 Self-referencing cryptic crossword

Logic puzzles
Puzzle